is a railway station in the city of Ichinomiya, Aichi Prefecture, Japan, operated by Meitetsu.

Lines

Station layout
The station has one side platform, serving a single bi-directional track. The station has automated ticket machines, Manaca automated turnstiles and is unattended.

Adjacent stations

|-
!colspan=5|Nagoya Railroad

Station history
Futago Station was opened on October 1, 1924 as a station on the privately held Bisai Railroad, which was purchased by Meitetsu on August 1, 1925 becoming the Meitetsu Bisai Line. The station was closed in 1944 and reopened on October 15, 1949.

Passenger statistics
In fiscal 2013, the station was used by an average of 2637 passengers daily.

Surrounding area
Aichi Cardiovascular and Respiratory Center
Ichinomiya Nishi High School

See also
 List of Railway Stations in Japan

References

External links

 Official web page 

Railway stations in Japan opened in 1924
Railway stations in Aichi Prefecture
Stations of Nagoya Railroad
Ichinomiya, Aichi